Catawba Island State Park is a  public recreation area located on Lake Erie, six miles northeast of Port Clinton, Ohio. Boating, fishing and picnicking are the major activities of the park. The state park, along with the other units in Ohio's Lake Erie state parks group, was established in the early 1950s.

References

External links
Catawba Island State Park Ohio Department of Natural Resources

State parks of Ohio
Protected areas of Ottawa County, Ohio